Xuanduan, also known as yuanduan, is a form of Chinese court dress (and/or ritual garment) which was made of dark or black fabric. It is a form of yichang (i.e. a set of attire composed of upper and lower garment). It was worn since the Western Zhou dynasty. During the Ming dynasty, under the reign of Emperor Jiajing, the xuanduan became a model for the regulations reforms related to yanfu (casual or leisure clothing) worn by the Emperor and officials.

Terminology 
The term xuanduan appears in the Liji in the section Yuzao (玉藻) and in the Zhouli. The xuanduan is named after its shape (端, duan) which is angular (i.e. it is made by using the whole width of a squared-shape fabric) and by its colour.  The character xuan (玄) can literally be translated as 'dark' or 'black'. The term xuanduan is literally translated as 'dark coloured Square-cut', or 'Black and square-edged', although some authors have also translated it as 'dark solemn' or 'black straight'.

History 
During the Western Zhou dynasty, it was a form of a daily clothing which was worn by the Emperor and ordinary commoners.

In the Zhou dynasty, it was worn by emperor when they were not at court, on sacrificial occasions by princes, and by scholars when they would pay their respects to their parents in the morning.

According to the Liji in the section Yuzao, it was also a form of ritual clothing for the Emperor, who wore it to salute the appearance of the sun outside the eastern gate and when he would listen to notification on the first day of the first month outside the southern gate; and by the Princes of States who wore xuanduan when sacrificing (诸侯玄端以祭).

Ming dynasty 
During the reign of Emperor Jiajing of Ming, sartorial reforms took place. Emperor Jiajing reformed yanfu (i.e. daily casual or leisure clothes, worn at home by the emperor, the officials and by the appointed ladies of the court), especially those he, himself, had to wear when he was not engaged in official duties. Emperor Jiajing therefore sought the help of Grand Secretary Zhang Zong (1476–1539) to investigate the dress regulations which were governing the casual clothing in ancient time. Zhang Zong therefore consulted the Lishu and found out that the xuanduan was most widely worn in ancient times beside the formal court attire, mianfu; this led the Jiajing emperor to decree that the yanfu of both the Emperor and the officials had to be modelled after the xuanduan:   

According to the new regulations, the Emperor's xuanduan (yanbian guanfu, lit. 'Dress of the Casual Hat') was black (玄) in colour and was decorated with 143 dragons, including a large dragon medallion at the front of the garment; it was also decorated with a green trim border. The royal princes had to wear a green xuanduan which was decorated with a green trim and decorated with two ranks badges of dragon design (baohe guanfu, lit. 'Dress of Preserving Harmony'). The xuanduan used as the yanfu of the officials (zhongjing guanfu, 忠靖冠服, lit. 'Dress of Loyalty and Tranquility') were dark green in colour. Officials of the third rank and above had xuanduan decorated with cloud patterns while the xuanduan worn by the officials who ranked fourth and below wore plain xuanduan.

Design and construction 
The xuanduan is a form of yichang, which is composed of an upper garment called yi and a lower garment called chang (skirt). According to the Zhouli, the standard xuanduan had sleeves and body of equal size (two chi, two cun long) and the sleeve opening was made of one chi, two cun. It was made of a whole width of square fabric which was dyed black (or dark) in colour.

The colour of the skirt (chang) which matches with the upper garment varied depending on rank: i.e. Shi (士) officials of high rank wore black lower garment, middle-rank Shi officials wore yellow lower garment, while the low-rank Shi officials wore lower garment in motleys.

Gallery

See also 

 Hanfu
 List of Hanfu
 Ruqun
 Pienfu
 Mianfu

References 

Chinese traditional clothing